The steamboat George E. Starr operated in late 19th century as part of the Puget Sound Mosquito Fleet and also operated out of Victoria, B.C.  Geo. E. Starr also served for a time in California and on the Columbia River.

Construction

Geo. E. Starr was built at Seattle in 1878 at the shipyard of J.F.T Mitchell for the Puget Sound Steam Navigation Company’s (the "Starr Line") international route to Victoria, B.C. Starr was a sidewheel steamer with a single-cylinder walking-beam engine, 148' long, 28' in beam over the hull, and 9 foot depth of hold, and rated at 473 tons.

Early operations
In 1881, the Oregon Railway and Navigation Company, under Henry Villard bought out the Starr Line and all their steamers, including Geo. E. Starr, Isabel, Alida, Otter, and Annie Stewart. The new management ran Geo. E. Starr hard in a rate war with an older sidewheeler on the Sound, Eliza Anderson.  In 1889, the Eliza Anderson nearly sank Geo. E. Starr in a fog-bound collision off Coupeville. In 1892, the Starr was transferred south to California for a year.  When she returned, she was under the control of the Northwest Steamship Company, and ran between Seattle, Port Townsend and the mill ports.

Purchase by Joshua Green
George E. Starr was one of the first vessels, along with the sternwheeler Fannie Lake, Annie M. Pence, Utopia, and Rapid Transit, purchased by Joshua Green and his partners of the La Conner Trading and Transportation Company.  Geo. E. Starr was considered sufficiently elegant at that time to allow President Rutherford B. Hayes, visiting Seattle, to spend a night in one of her cabins.

Transfer to Alaska
When the Alaska Gold Rush started in 1897, many older vessels were pressed into service in an effort to make money off gold seekers headed for the north country.  Geo. E. Starr was no exception.  Under Capt. E.E. Caine, the Starr was made ready to, and did in fact depart for Skagway and Dyea on August 3, 1897, with 90 passengers and a cargo of 100 horses.

Return to Puget Sound
Geo. E. Starr survived her service in Alaska, and by 1904 was running in Puget Sound again, under the ownership of the La Conner Trading and Transportation Company.  On alternating days, Starr and Utopia left Pier 2, at the foot of Yesler Street in Seattle bound for Whatcom, Fairhaven, and Anacortes, with the Starr on her trips going on to Blaine where travelers could make connection with a steamer bound for Point Roberts. On this run, Starr and Utopia were competing against the Bellingham (ex Willapa, ex General Miles) of the Bellingham Bay Transportation Company.

Reputation as slow boat
Geo. E. Starr served a long time, and towards the end she acquired the reputation as a very slow boat, as shown by the following waterfront doggerel:

Maneuvering the old boat was difficult, as when making turns, she would list over and not right herself, which, as she was a sidewheeler, caused her to spin round and round in circles.  To prevent this from happening, her skipper, Capt. Gunder Hansen set up a counterbalance on the deck consisting of an old cart loaded with two or three tons of old anchor chain, rigged to cross the deck with a traveler arrangement of block and tackle.  Captain Hansen, a native of Norway, instructed all deck hands: "When I yingle the bell, you move the car," which resulted in Captain Hansen’s becoming known on the Sound as Yingle Bell Yohnny.

Despite all this, Joshua Green remained fond of Geo. E. Starr, remarking sometimes when she was particularly tardy: "The Starr must have an exceptionally fine load of freight this trip to be this late." Later, Green wrote of the Starr:

Transfer to Columbia River
Near the end of her career, Geo. E. Starr was transferred to the Columbia River, where she worked as a tow boat.

Final disposition

Geo. E. Starr was abandoned about 1921 in (or was eventually towed to) Lake Union, where she rotted and slowly sank.

References

External links

University of Washington on-line images
Geo. E. Starr  This is a good image showing Geo. E. Starr under way on a foggy day in calm water.
profile view of Geo. E. Starr at a pier, possibly in Seattle  This undated image appears to have been taken at an earlier date in the vessel's career, as the camera required a long enough exposure so the flags on the masts are blurred by their waving in the breeze as the film (or glass plate) was exposed.
good clear image of Geo. E. Starr docked at Seattle, 1894  In this photo, the city of Seattle is starting to assume its modern appearance, with steep streets built on wooden cribbing stretching back from the waterfront.
Geo. E. Starr and Rosalie at piers in Seattle This photographs shows the Geo. E. Starr at the same pier as in the other 1894 photograph linked above.  In the foreground is another well-known Puget Sound steamer, the Rosalie a propeller-driven craft, providing an interesting contrast with the older sidewheeler.

Steamboats of Washington (state)
Sidewheel steamboats of Washington (state)
Steamboats of California
Steamboats of the Columbia River
Paddle steamers of British Columbia
Steamboats of Oregon
Puget Sound Navigation Company
1878 ships